The Starburst Intersection refers to the intersection of six streets in northeast Washington, D.C.: Bladensburg Road NE (part of U.S. Route 1 Alternate (US 1 Alt.), Benning Road NE, 15th Street NE, Maryland Avenue NE (also part of US 1 Alt.), and H Street NE intersect directly, and to the immediate northwest of this intersection is the easternmost point of Florida Avenue. The name "starburst" refers to the star-like shape created by these roads when viewed on a map.

The Starburst Intersection also serves as a demarcation point between four Washington, D.C. neighborhoods: Carver Langston to the northeast, Trinidad to the northwest, Near Northeast to the southwest, and Kingman Park to the southeast. Neighborhood history and photos are captured on a Greater H Street NE Heritage Trail historical marker at the intersection.

Transit
The Starburst Intersection is considered one of the city's most complicated, involving 10 lanes of traffic and 2 streetcar lanes.

The DC Streetcar provides east–west transportation along H Street NE and Benning Road NE in addition to two-way traffic. Maryland Avenue and Bladensburg Road are served by two-way traffic. 15th Street NE is one-way traffic northbound. The area is served by Metrobus lines X1, X2, X3, X8, X9, and B2. and Capital Bikeshare.

On January 10, 2019, ANC 6A voted to request "No Turn on Red" signs from DDOT at various points of the intersection.

History

With the city of Bladensburg, Maryland founded in 1742, Bladensburg Road was an existing route from Bladensburg south to the Potomac River's "Eastern Branch" through the area that would later become Washington, DC. In the early 1800s, city leaders in Washington established a toll gate at the intersection to create a private toll turnpike to Bladensburg. In 1871 District officials made the Bladensburg Turnpike into a toll-free city street.

Maryland Avenue, 15th Street, H Street and Boundary Road (later known as Florida Avenue) were part of the original L'Enfant Plan for Washington, DC, with this intersection depicted on the northern edge of the proposed map. Some variations of the map include a reference to "Old road to Bladensburg" at the intersection.

"Benning's Road" appears on maps dating as far back as 1861 and was an important connection from the City of Washington to Benning Bridge crossing the Anacostia River.

The land to the north and east of the L'Enfant Plan was farmland owned by William Corcoran. During the Civil War, the area was used as a temporary artillery military camp known as Camp Barry.

From 1871 to 1899, Graceland Cemetery was located on a 30-acre plot on the northeast corner of the intersection between Bladensburg and Benning Roads. Upon closure of the cemetery, Maryland Avenue and adjacent streets were expanded through this location. In the 1920s, Sidney Hechinger purchased this property and used it as a lumberyard, warehouse and headquarters for his hardware business. When company operations moved to Maryland in 1975, his son John Hechinger decided to build a mall on the property to serve as "an oasis of retail shopping in a consumer market that was vastly under-served". Hechinger Mall opened in 1981 as the largest inner-city shopping center in the United States and remains an active retail location today.

The Washington Brick Machine Company purchased 150 acres of land north of Boundary Road between present-day Gallaudet University and Bladensburg Roads in 1884. Later, this land would be sold and converted into American League Park, a baseball stadium that was home to the Washington Senators from 1901 to 1903.

The Columbia Railway began horse car service along H Streets NW and NE in 1870, later switching to electrical streetcars. The line terminated at 15th Street NE.

From 1908 to 1935 the Washington, Baltimore and Annapolis Electric Railway provided passenger and freight service on an electrified route terminating at the Starburst Intersection.

Starburst Plaza

The parcel of land at the intersection of Bladensburg and Benning Roads is known as Starburst Plaza.

Cornerstones of History Mural

Located on the Starburst Plaza is the "Cornerstones of History" mural, created by sculptor and designer Steven Weitzman for the DC Commission on the Arts and Humanities and dedicated in 2013. The terrazzo mural, installed as the focus of a fountain, honors Duke Ellington, Bessie Smith, Martin Luther King Jr., and Rosa Parks. When the water feature is activated, water flows on either side of the mosaic.

See also
Streets and highways of Washington, D.C.
List of state-named roadways in Washington, D.C.
History of Washington, D.C.

References

Streets in Washington, D.C.
Near Northeast (Washington, D.C.)
U.S. Route 1
Road junctions in the United States